Anamnesis (from the Attic Greek word , meaning "reminiscence" or "memorial sacrifice") is a liturgical statement in Christianity in which the Church refers to the memorial character of the Eucharist or to the Passion, Resurrection and Ascension of Jesus. It has its origin in Jesus' words at the Last Supper, "Do this in memory of me" ((Luke 22:19, 1 Corinthians 11:24-25).

In a wider sense, anamnesis is a key concept in the liturgical theology: in worship the faithful recall God's saving deeds. This memorial aspect is not simply a passive process but one by which the Christian can actually enter into the Paschal mystery.

In Eucharistic prayers
Almost all Eucharistic prayers (or anaphoras) contain an anamnesis. This part of the anaphora is usually placed after the consecration, i.e. after the account of the Last Supper in which are pronounced the Words of Institution spoken by Jesus. The Words of Institution are usually ended by the sentence "Do this in memory of me", which meaning is thus prepared and immediately taken up by the following anamnesis.

For example, in the Divine Liturgy of Saint John Chrysostom, the anamnesis is:

In the Western Roman Canon, the wording of the anamnesis is:

In the Byzantine Rite, other services besides the Divine Liturgy will have an anamnesis, such as the Great Sanctification of Waters at Theophany. An Episcopal Dictionary of the Church says of the anamnesis: "This memorial prayer of remembrance recalls for the worshiping community past events in their tradition of faith that are formative for their identity and self-understanding" and makes particular mention of its place in "the various eucharistic prayers".

See also
 Memorial Acclamation
 Transubstantiation

References

Footnotes

Bibliography

Further reading

External links 
The Eucharistic Prayer: The Mystery of Faith & Anamnesis

Christian terminology
Eucharist
Greek words and phrases